The Christopher McEwen House was a property in Franklin, Tennessee that was listed on the National Register of Historic Places, but later was removed from the Register, in 1995.

It was built in c.1836 and included Federal and Colonial Revival architecture.

Its NRHP eligibility was addressed in a 1988 study of Williamson County historical resources.

It was removed from the Register in 1995.  Usually when a property is removed that means its historic building(s) have been demolished or otherwise lost their historic integrity.

See also
David McEwen House, also NRHP-listed in Franklin, Tennessee

References

Former National Register of Historic Places in Tennessee
Houses in Franklin, Tennessee
Federal architecture in Tennessee
Colonial Revival architecture in Tennessee
Houses completed in 1836
Houses on the National Register of Historic Places in Tennessee
National Register of Historic Places in Williamson County, Tennessee